Biševo is a village in the municipality of Rožaje, Montenegro.

Demographics
According to the 2011 census, its population was 434.

Notable people
Jakup Kardović, commander of the Sandžak Muslim militia
Shemsi Pasha (general), Ottoman Albanian general.

References

Populated places in Rožaje Municipality